Thomas Brereton (1782–1832) was an officer of the British Army. 

Thomas Brereton may also refer to:

Thomas Brereton (dramatist) (1691–1722), English dramatist
Sir Thomas Brereton, 2nd Baronet (1632–1674), of the Brereton baronets
Thomas Salusbury (Liverpool MP) (died 1756), born Thomas Brereton, British Whig politician

See also
Brereton (surname)